Johan Walem (born 1 February 1972) is a Belgian football manager and former player. He previously worked as head coach of the Kortrijk. Walem was considered one of the best Belgian midfielders of his generation. He gained 36 caps for the national team, scoring two goals.

Career
Walem was born in Soignies, Belgium. His former clubs are Molenbeek (as a youngster), Anderlecht, Udinese, Parma (on loan), Standard Liège, Torino and Catania. At Udinese, he was nicknamed Il Geometra (The Geometer) as he was very precise in his passes. His partnership with German striker Oliver Bierhoff was also praised at that time. After he retired he has worked as TV consultant for Belgacom TV and as youth-coach at Udinese Calcio. Walem took over the job as head coach of the Belgium national under-21 football team after the 2011–12 season.

Honours

Player
Anderlecht
Belgian First Division: 1992–93, 1993–94, 1994–95
Belgian Cup: 1993–94; runner-up 1996–97
Belgian Super Cup: 1993, 1995

Parma
Supercoppa Italiana: 1999

Udinese
UEFA Intertoto Cup: 2000

Belgium
 FIFA Fair Play Trophy: 2002 World Cup

Individual
Belgian Young Professional Footballer of the Year: 1991–92

Managerial statistics

References

External links

Voetbal international website 

1972 births
Living people
Belgian footballers
Belgium international footballers
Belgian expatriate footballers
Association football midfielders
R.S.C. Anderlecht players
Parma Calcio 1913 players
Udinese Calcio players
Standard Liège players
Torino F.C. players
Catania S.S.D. players
Belgian Pro League players
Serie A players
Serie B players
Expatriate footballers in Italy
UEFA Euro 2000 players
2002 FIFA World Cup players
K.V. Kortrijk managers
Belgian football managers
Cyprus national football team managers
People from Soignies
Footballers from Hainaut (province)